Stephen Russell Mallory Scarritt (January 14, 1903 – December 4, 1994) was a left fielder in Major League Baseball who played from  through  for the Boston Red Sox (1929–1931) and Philadelphia Phillies (1933). A native of Pensacola, Florida, he attended University of Florida.

In a four-season career, Scarritt was a .285 hitter (296-for-1037) with three home runs and 120 RBI in 285 games, including
119 runs, 44 doubles, 25 triples and a 17 stolen bases. In 265 outfield appeared, he collected a .956 fielding percentage (28 errors in 631 chances).

Scarritt died at the age of 91 in his home town of Pensacola, Florida.

Milestone 
 In 1929, Scarrit hit 17 triples, setting a record for a Red Sox rookie during a regular season that still stands.

External links
Baseball Library
Baseball Reference
Retrosheet

Boston Red Sox players
Philadelphia Phillies players
Major League Baseball left fielders
Baseball players from Florida
1903 births
1994 deaths
University of Florida alumni
Sportspeople from Pensacola, Florida
Rock Island Islanders players